This is a list in alphabetical order of cricketers who have played for the combined Oxford and Cambridge Universities cricket team in top-class matches since 1839. The team had top-level status and played 18 first-class cricket matches during its history. Seven of these took place between 1839 and 1939 against a variety of sides. The other 11 matches all occurred between 1968 and 1992 and were all played against international teams touring the British Isles. The last time the combined team played a first-class match was in 1992.

The team was generally composed of current students who were members of Cambridge University Cricket Club or Oxford University Cricket Club, but there were four matches between 1874 and 1893 in which a Past and Present combination played matches, with the team title adjusted accordingly. The 41 players who took part in those matches are included in this list.

The details are the player's usual name followed by the years in which he played for the team and then his name as it would appear on modern match scorecards (usually his surname preceded by all initials). Note that many players represented other first-class teams.

A

B

C

D
 John Davidson (1986) : J. E. Davidson
 William Davies (1848) : W. H. Davies
 Ryle de Soysa (1938) : G. R. J. de Soysa
 William Deacon (1848) : W. S. Deacon
 Eric Dixon (1938) : E. J. H. Dixon

E
 Phil Edmonds (1972–1973) : P. H. Edmonds
 Richard Ellis (1981) : R. G. P. Ellis
 John Evans (1910–1911) : A. J. Evans

F

G

H

I
 Imran Khan (1973–1974) : Imran Khan

J

K
 Michael Kaye (1938) : M. A. C. P. Kaye
 Christopher Keey (1992) : C. L. Keey
 Leslie Kidd (1910–1911) : E. L. Kidd
 Michael Kilborn (1987–1990) : M. J. Kilborn
 Roger Kimpton (1938) : R. C. M. Kimpton
 Robert Turner King (1848) : R. T. King
 Roger Knight (1968–1969) : R. D. V. Knight

L

M

N
 Charles Napier (1839) : C. W. A. Napier

O
 Jonathan Orders (1981) : J. O. D. Orders
 Dudley Owen-Thomas (1972) : D. R. Owen-Thomas

P

R

S

T

V
 Willem van der Merwe (1990) : W. M. van der Merwe

W

Y
 Gerald Yonge (1848) : G. E. Yonge

References

Oxford and Cambridge
Cricketers
Cricketers